The discography of American hip hop supergroup Tha Eastsidaz contains 2 studio albums, 3 singles and a few guest appearances.

Albums

Studio albums

Singles

As lead artist

As featured artist

Other charted songs

Guest appearances

Notes

A  "Feels So Good" did not enter the Billboard Hot R&B/Hip-Hop Songs, but peaked at number 6 on the Bubbling Under R&B/Hip-Hop chart, which acts as an extension to the Hot R&B/Hip-Hop Songs.

References 

Hip hop discographies